Electric rickshaws (also known as electric tuk-tuks, e-rickshaws, totos and e-tricycles) are small 3-wheeled vehicles powered by an electric motor and battery ranging from 650 to 1400 Watts. They save on fuel costs compared to auto rickshaws while offering greater ease-of-use than pulled rickshaws. This has led to their popularity and widened-acceptance in some cities since 2008.

If introduced in a systematic manner, electric rickshaws could be a low-emitter complementary transport for low-income people who suffer most from a lack of transport facility. They are mostly manufactured in India and China.

Development of E-Rickshaw market in India

Share of E-Rickshaw Production in India  
Electronic rickshaws have now transitioned from being a market entrant in the automobile industry of India to a leading short-distance transport solution.

This segment gained popularity between 2015 and 2018. Although this segment is dominated by a host of unorganized players, established manufacturers have also identified its growth opportunities and are expected to foray into the segment.

Sales of E-Rickshaw Trends in India  
Though e-rickshaws were introduced in India on the lines of China in the late 2010s, sales were very sporadic and not widespread. Due to the drive to have a greener transport industry (especially in tier-2 & tier-3 cities), the e-rickshaw market is vastly gaining base and is likely to gain a foothold in the coming years with the entry of established players in the segment as well.

Design and construction

These rickshaws have a mild steel tubular chassis, consisting of three wheels with a differential mechanism at the rear wheels. The motor is a brushless DC motor. The electrical system used in Indian versions is 48V and in Bangladesh is 60V. The body design from the most popular Chinese version is of very thin iron or aluminum sheets. Bodies made of fiberglass are also popular because of their strength and durability, resulting in low maintenance.

The vehicle's batteries are typically lead acid with a lifespan of 6–12 months. Deep cycle batteries designed for electric vehicles are rarely used.

Types

Load carriers
The load-carrying versions of these rickshaws differ in their upper body, load-carrying capacity, motor power, controller and other structural aspects, sometimes motor power is also increased in order to carry loads up to 500–1000 kg.

Solar

There are two types of solar vehicles:
 Directly solar-powered — fitted with solar panels. A directly solar-powered rickshaw is an electric auto rickshaw driven solely by one or more electric motors, powered by solar panels mounted on the vehicle and capable of operating while the vehicle is in motion. Theoretically, solar panels could provide power directly to the motor(s) without the need for batteries, but in reality this would be an improbable design choice for a rickshaw, given its intended purpose. In e-rickshaws, however, solar panels are not effective and are not frequently used.
 Indirectly solar-charged — In practice, the term solar rickshaw is most commonly used to describe battery-electric rickshaws whose batteries are indirectly solar-charged (i.e., independently of the vehicle) prior to use. This is usually facilitated by removing batteries in need of charging from the vehicle and exchanging them for batteries that have already been charged. Alternatively, batteries can be charged in-situ while the vehicle is parked, although this may limit daytime usage. The same battery replacement and in-situ charging methods are also used for non-'solar' batteries and vehicles.

Popularity
Electric rickshaws are most popular in Asia, especially in China, India, Bangladesh and Nepal. The low-cost Chinese models were the first electric rickshaws to become popular in those countries. China, Japan, India, and European countries (Switzerland, France, Germany) have researched and developed electric tricycles for commercial transport and are attempting to capture the growing market in Asia. The government has made efforts though to run them and made plans to issue licenses on a fee of 1.5tk, but there has been no action on this matter to date.

Bangladesh
Bangladesh imports electric rickshaws directly from China or via other countries. The well-established cities prefer them as cheaper and better means of transport. The government in an inter-ministerial meeting on 5 May 2011 banned the import and assembly of the vehicles and decided to send off-road those already plying, primarily on the ground that it consumes electricity mostly through illegal connections.

China

China is the largest manufacturer of electric rickshaws in the world, due to low labor cost, high production rates and encouraging government policies on foreign trade they import a large number on daily basis. There are hundreds of electric rickshaw manufacturers and thousands of parts producers. Their main market is within small towns or cities with insufficient public transport.

India

One of the first attempts to design electric rickshaws was done by Nimbkar Agricultural Research Institute in late 1990s. In India, these e-rickshaws are widely spread all over the country, starting to gain popularity around 2011. The design is now much different from cycle rickshaws.

Today, e-rickshaws play a vital role in providing livelihood to people in India. Due to their low cost and high efficiency, they are accepted on the Indian streets, but government policies have been threatening the e-rickshaw and banned its use in the capital city Delhi, but failed to put them off the streets. E-rickshaws are still rising in number and widely used in Delhi and other parts of India. In Delhi, as per government official's figures in April 2012, their number was over 100,000.

E-rickshaw law in India
Initially, e-rickshaws were unregulated by any central law in India. However, the Delhi High Court, banned running of e-rickshaws in Delhi on 31 July 2014 over safety concerns raised through a public interest litigation. In a rally held for regularization of e rickshaws in Delhi, transport minister Nitin Gadkari said that "municipal corporations would regularize e-rickshaws by registering them for a fee of just ₹100. After registering the e-rickshaw, corporations will have to issue identity cards to drivers, so they can earn their livelihood easily." Once the policy was in place, the corporation, along with traffic police, would have fix the amount of fine to be imposed for violation of the policy. However, the policy was never implemented. Certain states like Tripura had regularized the e-rickshaws through municipal bylaws or through state legislation. In March 2015, the Indian Parliament passed an amendment to the Motor Vehicles (Amendment) Bill, 2015 legalizing e-rickshaws. By July 2015, battery rickshaws are available for travel in many cities, and are now certified to ply with Registration No. plate by R.T.O. with insurance.

References

Shacket, Sheldon R. The Complete Book of Electric Vehicles. Northbrook, IL: Domus Books, 1979.
Whitener, Barbara. The Electric Car Book. Louisville, KY: Love Street Books, 1981.
Regulation threatens India's e-rickshaws
Govt stops sale of e-rickshaws - Indian Express
Electric rickshaws run out of steam
It’s cheaper: Dealers import rickshaw parts from China, assemble them here
Delhi Auto Expo: India chases electric mobility dream
Cheap rides, low costs: it’s Tuk-Tuk time in Tripura
How electric automobile is made - material, manufacture, making, history, used, parts, components, steps, product

Municipal corporations to frame policy on e-rickshaws in a month's time

 
Rickshaws
Electric vehicles
Micromobility